The 2006 First-Year Player Draft, Major League Baseball's annual amateur draft, was held on June 6 and 7.  It was conducted via conference call with representatives from each of the league's 30 teams.

First round selections

Supplemental first round selections

Compensation picks

Other notable players
Chris Tillman, 2nd round, 49th overall by the Seattle Mariners
Brett Anderson, 2nd round, 55th overall by the Arizona Diamondbacks
Wade LeBlanc, 2nd round, 61st overall by the San Diego Padres
Trevor Cahill, 2nd round, 66th overall by the Oakland Athletics
Justin Masterson, 2nd round, 71st overall by the Boston Red Sox
Jon Jay, 2nd round, 74th overall by the St. Louis Cardinals
Brennan Boesch, 3rd round, 82nd overall by the Detroit Tigers
Zach Britton, 3rd round, 85th overall by the Baltimore Orioles
Joe Smith, 3rd round, 94th overall by the New York Mets
Zach McAllister, 3rd round, 104th overall by the New York Yankees
Alex Cobb, 4th round, 109th overall by the Tampa Bay Devil Rays
Jared Hughes, 4th round, 110th overall by the Pittsburgh Pirates
Chris Johnson, 4th round, 129th overall by the Houston Astros
Chris Davis, 5th round, 148th overall by the Texas Rangers
Jeff Samardzija, 5th round, 149th overall by the Chicago Cubs
Christopher Archer, 5th round, 161th overall by the Cleveland Indians
George Kontos, 5th round, 164th overall by the New York Yankees
Jason Berken, 6th round, 175th overall by the Baltimore Orioles
Andrew Bailey, 6th round, 188th overall by the Oakland Athletics
Bud Norris, 6th round, 189th overall by the Houston Astros
Doug Fister, 7th round, 201st overall by the Seattle Mariners
Justin Turner, 7th round, 204th overall by the Cincinnati Reds
Mike Leake, 7th round, 218th overall by the Oakland Athletics, but did not sign
Dellin Betances, 8th round, 254th overall by the New York Yankees
Allen Craig, 8th round, 256th overall by the St. Louis Cardinals
Will Harris, 9th round, 258th overall by the Colorado Rockies
David Freese, 9th round, 273rd overall by the San Diego Padres
Ryan Kalish, 9th round, 283rd overall by the Boston Red Sox
Mark Melancon, 9th round, 284th overall by the New York Yankees
Desmond Jennings, 10th round, 289th overall by the Tampa Bay Devil Rays
Josh Roenicke, 10th round, 294th overall by the Cincinnati Reds
Craig Gentry, 10th round, 294th overall by the Texas Rangers
Kris Medlen, 10th round, 310th overall by the Atlanta Braves
Mat Latos, 11th round, 333rd overall by the San Diego Padres
Brandon Belt, 11th round, 343rd overall by the Boston Red Sox, but did not sign
Jordan Walden, 12th round, 372nd overall by the Los Angeles Angels of Anaheim
Mike Minor, 13th round, 379th overall by the Tampa Bay Devil Rays, but did not sign
Daniel Murphy, 13th round, 394th overall by the New York Mets
Daniel McCutchen, 13th round, 404th overall by the New York Yankees
Matt LaPorta, 14th round, 433rd overall by the Boston Red Sox, but did not sign
Dan Runzler, 17th round, 501st overall by the Seattle Mariners, but did not sign
Chris Heisey, 17th round, 504th overall by the Cincinnati Reds
Tony Watson, 17th round, 505th overall by the Baltimore Orioles, but did not sign
Josh Reddick, 17th round, 523rd overall by the Boston Red Sox
David Robertson, 17th round, 524th overall by the New York Yankees
Andrew Cashner, 18th round, 528th overall by the Colorado Rockies, but did not sign
Danny Valencia, 19th round, 576th overall by the Minnesota Twins
Josh Tomlin, 19th round, 581st overall by the Cleveland Indians
Casey Fien, 20th round, 592nd overall by the Detroit Tigers
Domonic Brown, 20th round, 607th overall by the Philadelphia Phillies
Vinnie Pestano, 20th round, 611th overall by the Cleveland Indians
Cory Luebke, 22nd round, 658th overall by the Texas Rangers, but did not sign
Derek Holland, 25th round, 748th overall by the Texas Rangers
Luke Gregerson, 28th round, 856th overall by the St. Louis Cardinals
Brock Ungricht, 30th round, 914th overall by the New York Yankees
Hector Santiago, 30th round, 915th overall by the Chicago White Sox
Alex Sanabia, 32nd round, 965th overall by the Florida Marlins
Matt Downs, 36th round, 1076th overall by the San Francisco Giants
J. D. Martinez, 36th round, 1086th overall by the Minnesota Twins, but did not sign
Brad Peacock, 41st round, 1231st overall by the Washington Nationals
Daniel Herrera, 45th round, 1345th overall by the Texas Rangers
Rocky Gale, 49th round, 1447th overall by the Kansas City Royals, but did not sign
Paul Goldschmidt, 49th round, 1453rd overall by the Los Angeles Dodgers, but did not sign
Jarrod Dyson, 50th round, 1475th overall by the Kansas City Royals

NFL players drafted
Riley Cooper, 15th round, 457th overall by the Philadelphia Phillies, but did not sign
Jake Locker, 40th round, 1212th overall by the Los Angeles Angels of Anaheim, but did not sign
Isaiah Stanback, 45th round, 1342nd overall by the Baltimore Orioles, but did not sign
Kyle Williams, 47th round, 1417th overall by the Chicago White Sox, but did not sign

Background
Pitching accounted for 18 of the 30 selections in the first round of the 2006 First-Year Player Draft, including the top choice, right-hander Luke Hochevar, who was chosen by the Kansas City Royals. The University of Tennessee product pitched for the Fort Worth Cats of the Independent League after not reaching terms with the Los Angeles Dodgers, who selected him in the sandwich round (40th overall) of the 2005 First-Year Player Draft.

Six of the first seven picks and nine of the first 12 selections were pitchers. In addition to the 18 hurlers, seven outfielders, three third basemen and two catchers made up the rest of the first round.

The first six picks were from the college ranks. University of North Carolina pitchers Andrew Miller (6th overall, Tigers) and Daniel Bard (28th, Red Sox) and University of Texas teammates Drew Stubbs (8th overall, Reds) and Kyle McCulloch (29th, White Sox) went in the first round.

Kyle Drabek, the son of longtime Major League pitcher Doug Drabek, was chosen by the Philadelphia Phillies with the 18th pick. He is currently a free agent.

Detroit's Andrew Miller became the first player from the 2006 Draft to reach the Major Leagues. He debuted in relief during a doubleheader at Yankee Stadium on August 30. He would make eight relief appearances for the Tigers during their pennant-winning season. He currently pitches in the St. Louis Cardinals organization and has also played for the New York Yankees, Baltimore Orioles, Florida Marlins, Boston Red Sox and Cleveland Indians.

Tim Lincecum was the first 2006 draftee to be selected to an All-Star Game. Lincecum was selected in 2008, and joined shortly thereafter by Evan Longoria, who was selected via the Final Vote. Longoria was the only one to play in the game. Longoria would later be voted Rookie of the Year. Lincecum was also the first to win a Cy Young Award (2008 and 2009) in the National League. Clayton Kershaw, 7th in the draft, went on to win the 2011, 2013 and 2014 NL Cy Young Awards, the 2014 NL MVP Award and played in the 2011, 2012, 2013, 2014, and 2015 All-Star Games.

Andrew Bailey, 6th round pick by the Oakland Athletics, became the 2009 American League Rookie of the Year and participated in the 2009 All-Star Game in St. Louis and 2010 All-Star Game in Anaheim as part of the Athletics. He retired after the 2017 season. Chris Coghlan, a supplemental first round pick, was the 2009 National League Rookie of the Year as a member of the Miami Marlins.  he is currently a free agent.

Ryan Kalish, an outfielder who planned to attend the University of Virginia, was picked in the 9th round by the Boston Red Sox. His salary of $600,000 had to be approved by the Commissioner's Office, as it was well over what others drafted in that round were to receive. He signed with the Red Sox and made his major league debut in 2010.

Max Scherzer, 1st round pick of the Arizona Diamondbacks and later traded to the Detroit Tigers, won the 2013 Cy Young Award. He is now with the New York Mets.

External links
MLB.com - 2006 Draft Tracker (all rounds)
MLB.com - Draft History
Complete draft list from The Baseball Cube database

References

Major League Baseball draft
Draft
Major League Baseball draft